Marques de Caceres is a wine producer based in Cenicero, Rioja Alta, Spain. Their wines are among the most widely distributed Spanish brand wines in the United States.

The winery was founded in 1970 by Henri Forner at the Cenicero in Rioja Alta, and named after an investor. Forner's wine-making family had fled to France during the Spanish Civil War. The first wines were released in 1975.

Sources

Wineries of Spain